The Malaysian earthtiger tarantula, scientific name Omothymus schioedtei, is a species of spider in the family Theraphosidae (tarantulas), found in Peninsular Malaysia. It is also known by the synonym Cyriopagopus schioedtei.

Description
Omothymus schioedtei is a large and colourful arboreal tarantula from the subfamily Ornithoctoninae.  It is a very large spider with a leg span of 22 cm and a carapace length above 3 cm. There is a distinct sexual dimorphism.  The male is olive green with faint yellow leg striation. The male has a blunt tibial apophysis and long slender legs. Subadult males can be easily sexed by the epigynal fusillae method, as well as turning greener and greener for each molt until maturity. This is especially easy to see by the ventral coloration as subadult males are green and subadult females are black.

Taxonomy
Omothymus schioedtei was first described by Tamerlan Thorell in 1891, the type species of his new genus Omothymus. In 1903, Eugène Simon synonymized Omothymus with Cyriopagopus, hence Omothymus schioedtei became Cyriopagopus schioedtei.

The relationship between a number of genera of East Asian spiders was unclear . A. M. Smith and M. A. Jacobi in 2015 restored the species to its original name of Omothymus schioedtei, on the grounds that the type species of the genus Cyriopagopus, C. paganus, was not distinct from the genus Haplopelma, unlike C. schioedtei. They also synonymized Haplopelma with Cyriopagopus.

Distribution and habitat
The species is found in Malaysia. It lives in primary lowland and foothill monsoon forest in hollow trees many meters up. Adult females are almost entirely found in large mature trees, but younger animals can be found behind loose bark, in rock crevices and in man made structures like bridges and board walks.

References

Theraphosidae
Spiders of Asia